Donald James Benjamin Fraser (25 October 1901 – 7 November 1978) was an Australian rules footballer who was a noted goalkicker for the Oakleigh Football Club in the Victorian Football Association in the 1920s and 1930s. He also played in the VFL for two seasons the Richmond Football Club.

He went on to play in premiership sides for suburban team Fairfield in 1926 and 1928 and for Oakleigh in the VFA in 1930 and 1931.

From 1922, when he commenced playing for Richmond's seconds, to 1935, when he played his final season for Oakleigh, Fraser kicked 949 goals from his 254 games.  He twice won competition goalkicking awards and led his club goalkicking for ten seasons.

His son, "Mopsy" Fraser, played 124 games for Richmond in the late 1940s and early 1950s.

Footnotes

References 
 Fiddian, Marc: Devils at Play: A History of the Oakleigh Football Club, Pakenham Gazette, Pakenham 1982
 Hogan P: The Tigers Of Old, Richmond FC, (Melbourne), 1996.

External links
 
 Don Fraser, at The VFA Project.
 Don Fraser, at Boyles Football Photos.

1901 births
1978 deaths
Australian rules footballers from Melbourne
Australian Rules footballers: place kick exponents
Richmond Football Club players
Oakleigh Football Club players
People from Richmond, Victoria